|}

|}

The Summer Mile Stakes is a Group 2 flat horse race in Great Britain open to horses aged four years or older. It is run at Ascot over a distance of 7 furlongs and 213 yards (1,603 metres), and it is scheduled to take place each year in July.

History
The event was formerly known as the Silver Trophy Stakes, and it used to be held at Lingfield Park. For a period it was a Listed race open to horses aged three or older, and it was contested over 7 furlongs and 140 yards. It was run as a handicap from 1993 to 1998. It was switched to Ascot and extended to a mile in 1999.

The Silver Trophy Stakes was promoted to Group 3 level in 2003, and from this point it excluded three-year-olds. It returned to Lingfield when Ascot was closed for redevelopment in 2005. That year's edition was the first Group race in Britain run on a synthetic surface.

The event was renamed the Summer Mile Stakes in 2006. It was upgraded to Group 2 status and transferred back to Ascot in 2007.

Records
Most successful horse since 1986 (2 wins):
 Green Line Express – 1990, 1991
 Mutakayyef - 2016, 2017

Leading jockey since 1986 (4 wins):
 Dane O'Neill - Cape Town (2001), Mutakayyef (2016, 2017), Mohaather (2020)

Leading trainer since 1986 (4 wins):
 Richard Hannon Sr. – Hard Round (1986), Wallace (1999), Cape Town (2001), Dick Turpin (2011)

Winners since 1986

See also
 Horse racing in Great Britain
 List of British flat horse races

References
 Racing Post:

 galopp-sieger.de – Summer Mile Stakes.
 horseracingintfed.com – International Federation of Horseracing Authorities – Summer Mile Stakes (2017).
 pedigreequery.com – Summer Mile Stakes – Ascot.
 pedigreequery.com – Silver Trophy Stakes – Ascot.

Flat races in Great Britain
Ascot Racecourse
Open mile category horse races